Radical 149 or radical speech meaning "speech" is one of the 20 Kangxi radicals (214 radicals in total) composed of 7 strokes.

In the Kangxi Dictionary, there are 861 characters (out of 49,030) to be found under this radical.

 is also the 166th indexing component in the Table of Indexing Chinese Character Components predominantly adopted by Simplified Chinese dictionaries published in mainland China, with the simplified component form  listed as its associated indexing component.

Evolution

Derived characters

Variant forms
The first stroke of this radical character is printed differently in different languages, while in writing, the slant dot form is overwhelmingly preferred.

Literature

External links

Unihan Database - U+8A00

149
166